"Ocean" is the thirty-ninth single by B'z, released on August 10, 2005. This song is one of the duo's many number-one singles in the Oricon charts, and has sold over 505,000 copies. As B-sides, the single features "Dear My Lovely Pain" and "Narifuri Kamawazu Dakishimete", which is an outtake from The Circle. "Ocean" was used as the theme of Umizaru Evolution, a Japanese television drama adaptation of the manga Umizaru.

The song has received three certifications from the RIAJ: a double platinum shipping certification, a double platinum ringtone download certification and a gold full-length cellphone download certification.

Track listing 
 "Ocean"

"Dear My Lovely Pain"

Certifications

References

External links 
B'z performance at Oricon
 

2005 singles
B'z songs
Oricon Weekly number-one singles
Japanese television drama theme songs
Songs written by Tak Matsumoto
Songs written by Koshi Inaba
2005 songs